No. 282 Squadron was a Royal Air Force air-sea rescue squadron during the Second World War.

History
No. 282 Squadron was formed at RAF Castletown, Scotland on 1 January 1943 as an air-sea rescue squadron. The squadron was equipped with the Supermarine Walrus and the Avro Anson. The squadron disbanded on 12 January 1944 when it was absorbed by 278 Squadron.

The squadron reformed at RAF Davidstow Moor on 1 February 1944 to provide air-sea rescue cover of the Western Approaches. The squadron kept the Walrus aircraft and additionally operated the Vickers Warwick and Supermarine Sea Otter.

At the end of the Second World War the squadron disbanded at RAF St Eval on 19 July 1945.

Aircraft operated

See also
List of Royal Air Force aircraft squadrons

References

Notes

Bibliography

 Halley, James J. The Squadrons of the Royal Air Force and Commonwealth, 1918-1988. Tonbridge, Kent, UK: Air Britain (Historians) Ltd., 1988. .
 Jefford, C.G. RAF Squadrons: A Comprehensive Record of the Movement and Equipment of All RAF Squadrons and Their Antecedents Since 1912, Shrewsbury, Shropshire, UK: Airlife Publishing, 1988. . (second revised edition 2001. .)
 Rawlings, John D.R. Coastal, Support and Special Squadrons of the RAF and their Aircraft. London: Jane's Publishing Company Ltd., 1982. .

External links

 squadron histories nos. 281-285 sqn

Military units and formations established in 1943
Aircraft squadrons of the Royal Air Force in World War II
282 Squadron
Rescue aviation units and formations
Military units and formations disestablished in 1945